South Sudanese Canadians are Canadian of South Sudanese ancestry or a South Sudanese who has Canadian citizenship. South Sudanese Canadians can also include children born in Canada to a Canadian parent and South Sudanese parent. South Sudanese 
Canadians immigrated to Canada in the 1980s and 1990s as refugees from Second Sudanese Civil War.

Notable people

 Bol Kong, professional basketball player 
 Tut Ruach, professional basketball player
 Mangisto Arop, professional basketball player
 Emmanuel Jal, musician, actor, former child soldier, and political activist
 Reema Major, rapper
 Adongo Agada Cham
Amanie Illfated, singer, model and activist

See also
 South Sudanese Americans
 South Sudanese Australians
 Sudanese Canadians

References

Ethnic groups in Canada
 
African Canadian
South Sudanese diaspora